"Apache Drop Out" is a song and single written by Jerry Lordan, Don Van Vliet and Herb Bermann, performed by the Edgar Broughton Band and released in 1970.

Of the Edgar Broughton Band's two hit singles in the UK this was their second and biggest. It made 33 on the UK Singles Charts in 1970 staying in the charts for 5 weeks.

Background
1970 was the year the Edgar Broughton Band was tipped for success. Bad management of the group prevented this and they had only two hit singles, neither of which broke into the top 30. The song combines the instrumental, Apache by the Shadows and Dropout Boogie by Captain Beefheart.

References 

1970 songs
1970 singles
Harvest Records singles
Songs written by Jerry Lordan
Songs written by Captain Beefheart
Edgar Broughton Band songs